Erik Doxtader is a scholar of rhetoric and critical theory. Born in Fort Collins, Colorado, Doxtader took a BA at the University of Kansas and both an MA and Ph.D. from the Department of Communication Studies at Northwestern University.

Career
Doxtader is a professor in the Department of English at the University of South Carolina, and the current editor of Philosophy & Rhetoric, an international quarterly journal published by the Pennsylvania State University Press. Prior to assuming the editorship in 2018, he served as the journal's Book Review Editor from 2005-2017.

Doxtader is a former Senior Research Fellow at the Institute for Justice and Reconciliation, a recognized non-governmental organization in Cape Town, South Africa. In 1999, he was awarded a 2000-2001 fellowship in the SSRC-MacArthur program in Peace and Security in a Changing World. His book, With Faith in the Works of Words: The Beginnings of Reconciliation in South Africa, received the 2010 Rhetoric Society of America book award.

Books

Monograph

Edited volumes

Book reviews

References 

University of Kansas alumni
Northwestern University School of Communication alumni
American rhetoricians
University of South Carolina faculty
Year of birth missing (living people)
Living people
Writers from Fort Collins, Colorado
University of California, Berkeley faculty
University of Wisconsin–Madison faculty
Academic journal editors
University of North Carolina at Chapel Hill faculty